The women's 800 metre freestyle competition of the swimming events at the 2013 Mediterranean Games took place on June 24 at the Mersin Olympic Swimming Pool in Mersin, Turkey.

The race consisted of sixteen length of the pool in freestyle.

Schedule 
All times are Eastern European Summer Time (UTC+03:00)

Records
Prior to this competition, the existing world and Mediterranean Games records were as follows:

Results
All times are in minutes and seconds.

Final

References

Swimming at the 2013 Mediterranean Games